Lukino may refer to:

Lukino, Tula Oblast, a village in Tula Oblast, Russia
Lukino, name of several other rural localities in Russia